Nagigia Island is an island located at the most south-western point of the Fiji Islands.  It is also known on some charts and maps as Denham Island.

Nagigia Island lies off the coast of the western end of Kadavu Island, Fiji's fourth largest island where the village of Nabukalevu-Ira is situated.

The Nagigia Island Resort is located on the south east part of the island. The island has high tourism value with surf beaches and dive sites.

References 

Islands of Fiji
Private islands of Fiji